Paul Palmentola (1888–1966) was an Italian-born American art director. He designed the film sets for more than two hundred productions during his career, much of his work during the 1930s and 1940s at low-budget studios such as Mayfair Pictures, Monogram and PRC. He was later employed by Columbia Pictures in the early 1950s, working on their adventure films and with Sam Katzman's unit.

Selected filmography

 The Honor of the Press (1932)
 The Heart Punch (1932)
 High Gear (1933)
 Her Resale Value (1933)
 Found Alive (1933)
 Revenge at Monte Carlo (1933)
 Alimony Madness (1933)
 Badge of Honor (1934)
 Hollywood Mystery (1934)
 I Hate Women (1934)
 Shadows of the Orient (1935)
 The Fire-Trap (1935)
 White Legion (1936)
 We Went to College (1936)
 The Devil Is a Sissy (1936)
 Wallaby Jim of the Islands (1937)
 Here's Flash Casey (1938)
 I Take This Oath (1940)
 Tiger Fangs (1943)
 Sweethearts of the U.S.A. (1944)
 Dixie Jamboree (1944)
 Swing Hostess (1944)
 Rogues' Gallery (1944)
 Jungle Woman (1944)
 Men on Her Mind (1944)
 Thundering Gun Slingers (1944)
 The Monster Maker (1944)
 The Contender (1944)
 I Accuse My Parents (1944)
 Shake Hands with Murder (1944)
 Seven Doors to Death (1944)
 Bluebeard (1944)
 Fog Island (1945)
 The Man Who Walked Alone (1945)
 The Phantom of 42nd Street (1945)
 Freddie Steps Out (1946)
 Vacation Days (1947)
 Two Blondes and a Redhead (1947)
 I Surrender Dear (1948)
 The Prince of Thieves (1948)
 Glamour Girl (1948)
 Make Believe Ballroom (1949)
 The Lost Tribe (1949)
 Chinatown at Midnight (1949)
 Barbary Pirate (1949)
 Kazan (1949)
 Captive Girl (1950)
 Revenue Agent (1950)
 Last of the Buccaneers (1950)
 Pygmy Island (1950)
 Tyrant of the Sea (1950)
 A Yank in Korea (1951)
 The Magic Carpet (1951)
 Purple Heart Diary (1951)
 Fury of the Congo (1951)
 When the Redskins Rode (1951)
 Harem Girl (1952)
 The Pathfinder (1952)
 A Yank in Indo-China (1952)
 Thief of Damascus (1952)
 Brave Warrior (1952)
 California Conquest (1952)
 Last Train from Bombay (1952)
 The Golden Hawk (1952)
 The 49th Man (1953)
 Fort Ti (1953)
 Serpent of the Nile (1953)
 Prince of Pirates (1953)
 Prisoners of the Casbah (1953)
 Jack McCall, Desperado (1953)
 Siren of Bagdad (1953)
 Flame of Calcutta (1953)
 Conquest of Cochise (1953)
 Savage Mutiny (1953)
 Charge of the Lancers (1954)
 The Iron Glove (1954)
 Drums of Tahiti (1954)
 Battle of Rogue River (1954)
 The Saracen Blade (1954)
 Masterson of Kansas (1954)
 Pirates of Tripoli (1955)
 New Orleans Uncensored (1955)
 Seminole Uprising (1955)
 Chicago Syndicate (1955)
 Apache Ambush (1955)
 Duel on the Mississippi (1955)
 The Crooked Web (1955)
 Inside Detroit (1956)
 The Houston Story (1956)
 Rock Around the Clock (1956)
 Miami Exposé (1956)
 The Tijuana Story (1957)
 Life Begins at 17 (1958)
 Juke Box Rhythm (1959)
 The Flying Fontaines (1959)

References

Bibliography 
 Michael L. Stephens. Art Directors in Cinema: A Worldwide Biographical Dictionary. McFarland, 1998.

External links 
 

1888 births
1966 deaths
American art directors
Italian art directors
Italian emigrants to the United States